Negaunee Public Schools is a school district headquartered in Negaunee, Michigan.

In addition to Negaunee, it includes Negaunee Township, Richmond Township (including Palmer), and a small section of Ishpeming Township.

History
In 2014, Dan Skewis became the superintendent.

During the COVID-19 pandemic in Michigan, the schools had fewer students than usual. COVID-era restrictions ended by August 2022.

In 2022 the district was building an indoor field for practice games.

Schools
 Lakeview Elementary School
 Negaunee Middle School
 Negaunee High School

References

External links
 Negaunee Public Schools
Education in Marquette County, Michigan
School districts in Michigan